Abietinaria inconstans is a species of cnidarian belonging to the family Sertulariidae.

The species is found in Northern Pacific Ocean.

References

Sertulariidae
Animals described in 1877
Cnidarians of the Pacific Ocean